The Division of Maranoa is an Australian electoral division in Queensland.

Maranoa extends across the Southern Outback and is socially conservative. In the 2016 and 2019 federal elections, Pauline Hanson's One Nation finished ahead of Labor, reaching 20% of the primary vote.

Maranoa is a stronghold for the Liberal National Party of Queensland. The current MP is David Littleproud, former Minister of Agriculture and current leader of the National Party.

Geography
Since 1984, federal electoral division boundaries in Australia have been determined at redistributions by a redistribution committee appointed by the Australian Electoral Commission. Redistributions occur for the boundaries of divisions in a particular state, and they occur every seven years, or sooner if a state's representation entitlement changes or when divisions of a state are malapportioned.

History

The division was proclaimed in 1900, and was one of the original 65 divisions to be contested at the first federal election. It is named after the Maranoa River, which runs through the division. Located in the mostly rural southwestern portion of the state, towns located in Maranoa include Charleville, Cunnamulla, Dalby, Roma, Kingaroy, Stanthorpe, Winton and Warwick.

Maranoa is a comfortably safe seat for The Nationals; it was the first Queensland seat won by that party. Originally a safe Labor seat, it has been in National hands for all but three years since the 1921 by-election, and without interruption since 1943. Maranoa was taken by the then-Country Party in 1943 despite a landslide Labor victory nationally—one of only seven seats won by the Country Party. At the 2016 and 2019 federal elections, One Nation overtook Labor for second place after preferences were distributed.

Presently, Maranoa is the Coalition's safest seat; Littleproud sits on a majority of 22 percent against One Nation and 25 percent against Labor. As of 2022 this is the only Federal seat won by the government from Labor in a by-election in over 100 years.

The seat was nicknamed the 'Kingdom of Maranoa' by John Howard after it returned the highest 'No' vote in the 1999 referendum on Australia becoming a republic. The seat's then MP put the result down to the electorate being "well informed".

Members

Election results

References

External links
 Division of Maranoa (Qld) — Australian Electoral Commission

Electoral divisions of Australia
Constituencies established in 1901
1901 establishments in Australia
Federal politics in Queensland